Herbert Blaine Lawson, Jr. is a mathematician best known for his work in minimal surfaces, calibrated geometry, and algebraic cycles.  He is currently a Distinguished Professor of Mathematics at Stony Brook University.  He received his PhD  from Stanford University in 1969 for work carried out under the supervision of Robert Osserman.

Research

Minimal surfaces
Lawson found in 1970 a method to solve free boundary value problems for unstable Euclidean constant-mean-curvature surfaces by solving a corresponding Plateau problem for minimal surfaces in S3.  He constructed compact minimal surfaces in the 3-sphere of arbitrary genus by applying Charles B. Morrey, Jr.'s solution of the Plateau problem in general manifolds.  This work of Lawson contains a rich set of ideas, among them the conjugate surface construction for minimal and constant mean curvature surfaces.

Calibrated geometry
The theory of calibrations, whose roots are in the work of Marcel Berger, finds its genesis in a 1982 Acta Mathematica paper of
Reese Harvey and Blaine Lawson.  The theory of calibrations has grown to be important because of its many applications to gauge theory and mirror symmetry.

Algebraic cycles
In his 1989 Annals of Mathematics paper "Algebraic Cycles and Homotopy Theory", Lawson proved a theorem which is now called the Lawson suspension theorem. This theorem is the cornerstone of Lawson homology and morphic cohomology which are defined by taking the homotopy groups of algebraic cycle spaces of complex varieties. 
 These two theories are dual to each other for smooth varieties and have properties similar to those of Chow groups.

Awards and honors
He was a 1973 recipient of the American Mathematical Society's Leroy P. Steele Prize, and was elected to the National Academy of Sciences in 1995. He is a former recipient of both the Sloan Fellowship and the Guggenheim Fellowship, and has delivered two invited addresses at International Congresses of Mathematicians, one on geometry, and one on topology. He has served as Vice President of the American Mathematical Society, and is a foreign member of the Brazilian Academy of Sciences.

In 2012 he became a fellow of the American Mathematical Society. He was elected to the American Academy of Arts and Sciences in 2013.

Major publications

 
 
 

 

 
 
 

 
 
Books

See also
Spin geometry

References

External links
 Homepage

20th-century American mathematicians
21st-century American mathematicians
Differential geometers
Stanford University alumni
Stony Brook University faculty
Living people
Members of the United States National Academy of Sciences
Fellows of the American Mathematical Society
Fellows of the American Academy of Arts and Sciences
1942 births
Mathematicians from Pennsylvania